Josh Martin may refer to:
 Josh Martin (American football)
 Josh Martin (footballer)

See also
 Joshua L. Martin, American politician